Seymour Island is an island around the tip of the Graham Land on the Antarctic Peninsula. 

Seymour Island may also refer to:

 Seymour Island (Nunavut), an uninhabited island in the Qikiqtaaluk Region of northern Canada's territory of Nunavut
Baltra Island, also known as South Seymour, in the Galápagos Islands in Ecuador
North Seymour Island, a small island near Baltra Island in the Galápagos Islands in Ecuador
 Seymour Airport, once known as Seymour Island Airfield, an airport serving the island of Baltra, one of the Galápagos Islands in Ecuador
 Seymour Island, in the Billington Sea pond,  Plymouth, Massachusetts, U.S.